The Main Building of the Russian Defense Ministry is the headquarters of the Russian Ministry of Defense, located in Moscow, Russia.

The building was designed by Russian architect Lev Rudnev and was renovated by Mikhail Posokhin who was the main architect of Moscow (1960–1982). Ground was broken for construction in 1940, and the building was dedicated in 1952.

The main ministry building, built in the 1940s and renovated in the 1980s, is located on Arbatskaya Square, near Arbat Street. Other buildings of the ministry are located throughout the city of Moscow. The high supreme body that is responsible for the Ministry's management and supervision of the Armed Forces is The National Defense Management Center (Национальный центр управления обороной РФ) which is located in Frunze Naberezhnaya and responsible for centralization of the Armed Forces' command.

The building has eight floors. The walls are decorated with marble, Ural stones: serpentine and granite.

See also
 Lobanov-Rostovsky Palace, Czarist equivalent
 General Staff Building (Saint Petersburg)

References
Notes

External links

 The Official website

Ministry of Defence (Russia)
Government buildings in Russia
Government buildings completed in 1979
Military installations of Russia
Buildings and structures in Moscow
Arbat District